Eritrea competed at the 2012 Summer Olympics in London, from 27 July to 12 August 2012. This was the nation's fourth appearance at the Olympics.

Eritrean National Olympic Committee sent a total of 12 athletes to the Games, 11 men and 1 woman, to compete only in athletics and road cycling, the first for the nation. Marathon runner Yonas Kifle had competed at every Olympic games since its national debut in Sydney, and was the oldest member of the contingent, at age 35. Steeplechase runner Weynay Ghebresilasie, the youngest of the team, at age 18, was Eritrea's flag bearer at the opening ceremony. For the second straight time, Eritrea failed to win a single Olympic medal at the London games.

Athletics

Eritrean athletes have so far achieved qualifying standards in the following athletics events (up to a maximum of 3 athletes in each event at the 'A' Standard, and 1 at the 'B' Standard):

Key
 Note – Ranks given for track events are within the athlete's heat only
 Q = Qualified for the next round
 q = Qualified for the next round as a fastest loser or, in field events, by position without achieving the qualifying target
 NR = National record
 N/A = Round not applicable for the event
 Bye = Athlete not required to compete in round

Men

Women

Cycling

Eritrea qualified one cyclist for the Games. It marked the first time Eritrea competed in a sport other than athletics.

Road

See also

Eritrea at the 2012 Winter Youth Olympics

References

External links
 
 

Nations at the 2012 Summer Olympics
2012
Summer Olympics